Monkland may refer to:

Monkland, Herefordshire, a small village in Herefordshire, England
Monkland, Ontario, Canada, a hamlet in North Stormont
Monkland, Oregon, an unincorporated community in Sherman County, Oregon, United States
Monkland, Queensland, a suburb of Gympie, Queensland, Australia
Monkland Village, a neighbourhood in the Montreal borough of Côte-des-Neiges–Notre-Dame-de-Grâce

See also
103 Monkland, a bus route in Montreal, Quebec, Canada
Monkland and Kirkintilloch Railway, an early mineral railway running from a colliery at Monklands to the Forth and Clyde Canal at Kirkintilloch, Scotland
Monkland Avenue (disambiguation) 
Monkland Canal unnavigable, partly culverted
Monkland Priory, a priory in Monkland, Herefordshire, England
Monkland Railways, formed by the merger of the Ballochney Railway, the Monkland and Kirkintilloch Railway and the Slamannan Railway
Monklands (disambiguation)

pl:Monkland